Whitson is a village in Wales.

Whitson may also refer to:

Whitson (surname)
15057 Whitson, main-belt asteroid
Cape Whitson, South Orkneys, Antarctica

See also
Whiston
Wiston
Wistow